Vlado Zlojutro (born 4 January 1988) is a Swedish footballer who plays for Vejby IF.

He previously played for Östers IF where he transferred in December 2012 after playing for two years as a midfielder for IFK Värnamo.

References

External links
Vlado Zlojutro SvFF
Eliteprospects profile 

1988 births
Living people
Association football midfielders
Swedish footballers
Swedish expatriate footballers
Östers IF players
Hammarby Fotboll players
IFK Värnamo players
Ängelholms FF players
Husqvarna FF players
Ontinyent CF players
Varbergs BoIS players
Allsvenskan players
Superettan players
Ettan Fotboll players
Division 2 (Swedish football) players
Swedish expatriate sportspeople in Spain
Expatriate footballers in Spain